Francis Newport, 1st Earl of Bradford PC (23 February 1620 – 19 September 1708), styled The Honourable between 1642 and 1651, was an English soldier, courtier and Whig politician.

Background
Born at Wroxeter, he was the eldest son of Richard Newport, 1st Baron Newport and his wife Rachel Leveson, daughter of Sir John Leveson (circa 1555 – 1615) and sister of Sir Richard Leveson (1598–1661). His younger brother was Andrew Newport. In 1651, he succeeded his father as baron. Newport was educated at Christ Church, Oxford.

Career
He represented Shrewsbury in both the Short Parliament and Long Parliament. A royalist during the English Civil War, he fought in 1644 in the Battle of Oswestry on the side of King Charles I of England and was then imprisoned. After the restoration in 1660, Newport became Custos Rotulorum of Shropshire, fulfilling this office for his lifetime. In the same year, he had been appointed also Lord Lieutenant of Shropshire, but on the command of King James II of England was replaced by George Jeffreys, 1st Baron Jeffreys in 1687. After Jeffrey's death and the Glorious Revolution in 1689, Newport was restored as Lord Lieutenant until 1704.

Newport was Comptroller of the Household between 1668 and 1672. Subsequently, he was appointed Treasurer of the Household, a post he held a first time until 1686, and three years later again until his death in 1708. Newport was also Cofferer of the Household from 1689 until the death of King William III of England in 1702.

In 1668, he was sworn of the Privy Council of England, expelled in 1679 for his opposition to the government, but readmitted in 1689. On 11 March 1675, he was elevated to the peerage as Viscount Newport, of Bradford, in the County of Shropshire, his main home. On 11 May 1694, he was further honoured when he was created Earl of Bradford.

Family and death

On 28 April 1642, Newport married Lady Diana Russell, fourth daughter of Francis Russell, 4th Earl of Bedford, at St Giles in the Fields, London, and had by her five daughters and four sons.

One daughter, Katherine, married Henry Herbert, 4th Baron Herbert of Chirbury: she left funds on her death in 1716 to endow almshouses in Preston upon the Weald Moors, Shropshire, as a thanksgiving for her rescue when lost on the Alps.

Newport died aged 88 in Twickenham

He was buried in St Andrew's Church, Wroxeter, two weeks later and was succeeded in his titles by his oldest son Richard. His younger son Thomas was raised to the Peerage of England in his own right.

References

|-

|-

|-

|-

|-

1620 births
1708 deaths
Alumni of Christ Church, Oxford
Cavaliers
01
Lord-Lieutenants of Shropshire
Members of the Privy Council of England
Treasurers of the Household
English MPs 1640 (April)
English MPs 1640–1648